Virginia Ruano Pascual and Paola Suárez were the defending champions, but did not compete this year.

Nadia Petrova and Meghann Shaughnessy won the title by defeating Martina Navratilova and Lisa Raymond 6–1, 1–6, 7–6(7–4) in the final. It was the 10th doubles title for both players in their respective doubles careers. It was also the 6th title for the pair during the season, after their wins in Miami, Amelia Island, Berlin, Rome and Los Angeles.

Seeds

Draw

Draw

References
 Main and Qualifying Draws (WTA)

Pilot Pen Tennis
Connecticut Open (tennis)
2004 Pilot Pen Tennis